Assura (or Assuras) was a town in the Roman province of Proconsular Africa.

Assura may also refer to:

 The Roman Catholic titular see of Assura
 Assura plc, a British company
 Assura Medical, a former division of Assura Group, now part of Virgin Group
 Code of Assura, an Assyrian code of laws
 A village in Cuyuni-Mazaruni, Guyana

See also
 Assur, an archaeological site in Iraq